Streets Is Watching may refer to:

Streets Is Watching (soundtrack)
Streets Is Watching (film)
The fifth track from Jay-Z's second album In My Lifetime, Vol. 1
The fourteenth track from the Young Money Entertainment collaboration studio album We Are Young Money